Vlah  is a surname, a reference to Vlachs. Notable people with the surname include:

 Irina Vlah (born 1974), Moldovan politician
 Petru Vlah (born 1970), Moldovan politician

See also
 Vlach (surname)